Rivomarginella electrum is a species of freshwater snail, gastropod mollusk in the family Marginellidae, the margin snails.

Distribution
It is native to Southeast Asia.

References

External links

Marginellidae
Gastropods described in 1865